Frechinia helianthiales is a moth in the family Crambidae. It was described by Mary Murtfeldt in 1897. It is found in North America, where it has been recorded from Arizona, Illinois, Manitoba, Missouri and Oklahoma, south to Mexico.

The length of the forewings is 6.5-8.5 mm. The forewings are white with yellowish-brown patches and some gray scales. The postmedial line is white, with a dark-grey patch inside this line containing black scales along the veins. The hindwings are white in males and dark grey in females. Adults have been recorded on wing from May to August.

The larvae feed on Helianthus species. They mine the leaves of their host plant.

References

Moths described in 1897
Odontiini